Gisela Dulko and Flavia Pennetta were the defending champions, but lost in the quarterfinals to María José Martínez Sánchez and Anabel Medina Garrigues.

Daniela Hantuchová and Agnieszka Radwańska won the tournament, defeating Liezel Huber and Nadia Petrova 7–6(5), 2–6, [10–8] in the final.

Seeds

Draw

Finals

Top half

Bottom half

References
 Main Draw

2011 WTA Tour
2011 Sony Ericsson Open
Women in Florida